Timothy Spafard Hillman (born March 13, 1948) is a Senior United States district judge of the United States District Court for the District of Massachusetts.

Biography

Hillman was born in 1948 in Chicago, Illinois. He received his Bachelor of Arts degree in 1970 from Coe College in Cedar Rapids, Iowa. He received his Juris Doctor in 1973 from Suffolk University Law School in Boston. After spending over a decade in private practice, he served as City Solicitor to the cities of Fitchburg and Gardner and as Town Counsel to the towns of Athol, Lunenburg and Petersham, all located in Massachusetts. He served as a Justice of the Massachusetts District Court from 1991 to 1998 and as a Justice of the Massachusetts Superior Court from 1998 to 2006. He served as a United States magistrate judge of the United States District Court for the District of Massachusetts from 2006 until 2012.

Federal judicial service

On November 30, 2011, President Barack Obama nominated Judge Hillman to be District Judge for the United States District Court for the District of Massachusetts. He would replace Judge Nancy Gertner, who retired in 2011. On February 15, 2012, he received a hearing before the Senate Judiciary Committee. On March 8, 2012, the Judiciary Committee reported his nomination to the floor of the Senate by a 17–1 vote, with Senator Mike Lee casting the only no vote. The Senate confirmed Hillman's nomination on June 4, 2012 by an 88–1 vote, with Senator Mike Lee again casting the sole no vote. Hillman received his judicial commission on June 6, 2012. He assumed senior status on  July 1, 2022.

References

External links

1948 births
Living people
21st-century American judges
Clark University faculty
Coe College alumni
Judges of the United States District Court for the District of Massachusetts
Lawyers from Chicago
Massachusetts School of Law faculty
Massachusetts Superior Court justices
Suffolk University Law School alumni
United States district court judges appointed by Barack Obama
United States magistrate judges